Marion O'Dell McKinney Jr. (July 24, 1921 – August 3, 1999) was a scientist at Langley Memorial Aeronautical Laboratory, who researched a wide variety of aerospace topics, including personal aircraft, dynamics, and aircraft configurations. Like many of his contemporaries, he conducted secret war-related research during World War II, the results of which were later declassified.

Biography
He was born on July 24, 1921, in Chattanooga, Tennessee to Marion O'Dell McKinney Sr. and Louise Blackwell. He graduated from Georgia Institute of Technology in 1942 with a degree in aeronautical engineering. In 1944 he married Betty Garner.

He was awarded the Wright Brothers Medal in 1964 for work on the aerodynamics of V/STOL aircraft.

He was the assistant chief of the Subsonic-Transonic Division of NASA. He retired from NASA in 1980.

He died on August 3, 1999, at Hampton General Hospital in Hampton Roads, Virginia.

See also
Research Papers from the NASA Technical Reports Server

References

External links
 

American aerospace engineers
People from Chattanooga, Tennessee
1999 deaths
1921 births
20th-century American engineers
Georgia Tech alumni